Potůčky is a municipality and village in Karlovy Vary District in the Karlovy Vary Region of the Czech Republic. It has about 400 inhabitants.

Administrative parts
The village of Stráň is an administrative part of Potůčky.

Geography
Potůčky lies in the Ore Mountains on the border with Germany. The municipality of Johanngeorgenstadt on the German side of the border was originally one settlement together with Potůčky.

References

Villages in Karlovy Vary District
Villages in the Ore Mountains
Czech Republic–Germany border
Divided cities